The Algeria International in badminton is an international open held in Algeria.

Previous winners

Performances by nation

External links
Algeria International Ranking points (.xls)

Badminton tournaments in Algeria
Sports competitions in Algeria